Grigory Vladimirovich Verichev (April 4, 1957 – May 25, 2006) was a Russian judoka who competed for the Soviet Union in the 1988 Summer Olympics.

In 1988 he won the bronze medal in the heavyweight class.

From 1990 to 1993 he competed for Frontier Martial-Arts Wrestling in Japan.

Championships and accomplishments
Frontier Martial-Arts Wrestling
WWA World Martial Arts Heavyweight Championship (1 time)
WWA World Martial Arts Tag Team Championship (1 time) - with Tarzan Goto
Street Fight Tag Team Tournament (1992) - with Atsushi Onita

External links
 
 

1957 births
2006 deaths
Russian male judoka
Soviet male judoka
Russian male professional wrestlers
Olympic judoka of the Soviet Union
Judoka at the 1988 Summer Olympics
Olympic bronze medalists for the Soviet Union
Olympic medalists in judo
Medalists at the 1988 Summer Olympics
Goodwill Games medalists in judo
Competitors at the 1986 Goodwill Games
20th-century professional wrestlers
FMW Brass Knuckles Heavyweight Champions